Philippe Chevallier may refer to:

 Philippe Chevallier (actor) (born 1956), French comedian and actor
 Philippe Chevallier (cyclist) (born 1961), French professional road bicycle racer